Holger Werfel Scheuermann (12 February 1877 – 3 March 1960) was a Danish surgeon after whom Scheuermann's disease is named.

Biography 
Holger Werfel Scheuermann was born into a medical family in Hørsholm, a small town between Copenhagen and Øresund. He began his studies in 1895 and graduated in medicine at the University of Copenhagen in 1902. He then spent his hospital service in Copenhagen at Det Kgl. Frederiks Hospital, at Sankt Johannesstiftelsen, as well as Rigshospitalet. At Rigshospitalet he was assistant at the departments of roentgenology and massage. Scheuermann trained in orthopaedic surgery and radiology, becoming a specialist in orthopaedics and radiology in 1918.

From 1910 to 1919 he was 1st assistant surgeon at the Copenhagen Home for the Crippled and then became director of radiology at the Military and Sundby Hospitals, and head physician to the navy. He undertook several study travels to Germany, Austria and Sweden, and was chairman of the Danske Røntgenologers Forening 1920–1922, and of Dansk Radiologisk Selskab 1933–1934. He also became a corresponding member of the American Academy of Orthopaedic Surgeons in 1936, the same year he was made a knight of the order of Dannebrog. Dannebrog is the name of the Danish flag.

After his retirement in 1947 he continued in private radiological practice for many years. In 1959 he received his doctoral degree, honoris causa, from the University of Copenhagen, nearly 40 years after his original submission.

Scheuermann died in 1960 in Copenhagen.

References

External links
 https://archive.today/20121224023343/http://www.jbjs.org.uk/cgi/reprint/43-B/2/394

1877 births
1960 deaths
People from Hørsholm Municipality
Danish surgeons
20th-century Danish physicians
20th-century surgeons